Primal Prey is a first-person shooter developed by Sunstorm Interactive
for Windows.

Gameplay
In Primal Prey, the player must hunt dinosaurs across five episodes. Each episode contains several missions that allows the player to either hunt or trap eight dinosaur species and one pterosaur:(Tyrannosaurus, Utahraptor, Troodon, Gastonia, Triceratops, Styracosaurus, Iguanodon, Lambeosaurus and Quetzalcoatlus).  A few of the missions allow the player to hunt dinosaurs for trophies. Each mission has its own storyline, and the player has to capture or kill a certain dinosaur, which they can bring back with them for a reward.

Critical reception
GameSpot rated Primal Prey as "bad", criticising the single map for being too small to allow the "tracking" game mechanics to be effective, the strange behaviour of the dinosaur's AI, and excessive fog which renders some equipment pointless (such as the sniper scope and night vision goggles). It was also considered graphically inferior to the similar Carnivores series. However, the shrink ray weapon was viewed as the game's one original idea.

References

External links
 Official website

2001 video games
First-person shooters
Hunting video games
Video games developed in the United States
Windows games
Windows-only games
Dinosaurs in video games